Ólafur Andrés Guðmundsson (born 13 May 1990) is an Icelandic handball player for GC Amicitia Zürich and the Icelandic national team.

He represented Iceland at the 2019 World Men's Handball Championship.

References

External links

IFK Kristianstad profile

1990 births
Olafur Gudmundsson
Living people
Olafur Gudmundsson
IFK Kristianstad players
Expatriate handball players
Olafur Gudmundsson
Olafur Gudmundsson
Olafur Gudmundsson
Handball-Bundesliga players